Craig Olejnik (born June 1, 1979) is a Canadian actor.

Early life
Olejnik graduated from West Kings District High School in Auburn, Nova Scotia. His father was in the military. His grandparents immigrated to Canada from Poland.

Career
Olejnik is known for his lead role in the television series The Listener as Toby Logan, a paramedic with the power to read minds by hearing others' thoughts and seeing events that happened to them from their point of view. His previous work includes Runaway, Thir13en Ghosts, Margaret's Museum and Wolf Lake. He is also the director, writer and producer of the film Interview with a Zombie.

Filmography

Film

Television

References

External links 
 

1979 births
Living people
21st-century Canadian male actors
Canadian cinematographers
Canadian male film actors
Canadian male screenwriters
Canadian male television actors
Canadian male voice actors
Canadian people of Polish descent
Male actors from Halifax, Nova Scotia